Hypotrix naglei is a moth of the family Noctuidae. It is known from east-central Arizona (White Mountains), south-eastern Arizona (Pinaleno, and Santa Catalina Mountains), south-central New Mexico (Capitan and Sacramento Mountains) and south-western New Mexico (Mimbres Mountains).

The habitat consists of open meadows in forests of aspen and pine.

The length of the forewings is 11–12 mm. Adults are on wing from mid-June to mid-July.

Etymology
It is named after Ray Nagle, a Lepidopterist who had opened his home in the Santa Catalina Mountains for Lepidoptera research and where some of the type series was collected.

External links
A revision of the genus Hypotrix Guenée in North America with descriptions of four new species and a new genus (Lepidoptera, Noctuidae, Noctuinae, Eriopygini)
mothphotographersgroup

Hypotrix
Moths described in 2010